Markus W. Covert (born April 24, 1973) is a researcher and professor of bioengineering at Stanford University who led the simulation of the first organism in software.
Covert leads an interdisciplinary lab of approximately 10 graduate students and post-doctoral scholars.

Education 
Covert received a B.S. in chemical engineering from Brigham Young University. He received a Ph.D. in bioengineering and bioinformatics from the University of California, San Diego in 2003 for his investigations into the interaction between microbial metabolism and transcriptional regulation under the supervision of Bernhard Palsson. He did his post-doctoral training in mammalian cell signaling at the California Institute of Technology under the supervision of David Baltimore.

Honors and distinctions 
 NIH Director's Pioneer Award, 2009
 Damon Runyon Cancer Research Foundation, Postdoctoral Fellowship
 Brigham Young University, Ezra Taft Benson Presidential Scholarship, 1991-1997

References 

1973 births
Stanford University School of Medicine faculty
Brigham Young University alumni
University of California, San Diego alumni
Systems biologists
Living people
Scientists from the San Francisco Bay Area